Endonuclease, poly(U) specific is a protein that in humans is encoded by the ENDOU gene.

Function

This gene encodes a protein with protease activity and is expressed in the placenta. The protein may be useful as a tumor marker. Multiple alternatively spliced transcript variants have been found for this protein. [provided by RefSeq, Feb 2010].

References

Further reading